Soyam Bapu Rao is an Indian politician. He was elected to the Lok Sabha, the lower house of the Parliament of India from Adilabad, Telangana in the 2019 Indian general election as a member of the Bharatiya Janata Party.

Early life
Soyam Bapu Rao was born on 28 April 1969 in Wajjar Adilabad, Telangana. He married Barathi Bai and has two sons and a daughter.

Career
Soyam Bapu Rao was elected as a MLA for Andhra Pradesh Assembly from a Boath, Adilabad district in 2004. In 2014 elections, Bapu Rao contested as a Telugu Desam Party candidate from Boath and lost to Rathod Bapu Rao. After the division of the state he joined in Indian Congress and contested the 2018 elections from Boath and lost to Rathod Bapu Rao.

In 2019 India General election, Soyam Bapu Rao of BJP won the Adilabad Lok Sabha constituency with a margin of 58,560 votes by defeating Godam Nagesh of TRS. Soyam Bapu Rao who secured 377,374 votes.

References

External links
Official biographical sketch in Parliament of India website

India MPs 2019–present
Lok Sabha members from Telangana
Living people
Bharatiya Janata Party politicians from Telangana
People from Adilabad
1969 births
Telangana Rashtra Samithi politicians
Indian National Congress politicians